Lieutenant Colonel Douglas Norman Stewart DSO MC (24 June 1913 – 25 July 1991) was a British equestrian who won a gold medal in the team event at the 1952 Summer Olympics. He was born in Doonholm, South Ayrshire and died in Midlem.

References

External links
Reference to the "late Colonel Duggie Stewart

1913 births
1991 deaths
Sportspeople from South Ayrshire
Scottish equestrians
British male equestrians
Olympic equestrians of Great Britain
Olympic gold medallists for Great Britain
Equestrians at the 1948 Summer Olympics
Equestrians at the 1952 Summer Olympics
Olympic medalists in equestrian
Medalists at the 1952 Summer Olympics
Scottish Olympic medallists
Royal Scots Greys officers